Long Beach, North Carolina is a coastal neighborhood on Oak Island incorporated in 1955. It is well known for the total devastation it sustained during Hurricane Hazel in 1954; only five of the 357 buildings survived the storm.  It merged with neighboring Yaupon Beach in 1999 to form the town of Oak Island and is now a neighborhood of the town.

The community derives its name from one of the longest stretches of beach in the area.

References

Geography of Brunswick County, North Carolina
Populated places established in 1955
Populated places disestablished in 1999
1955 establishments in North Carolina
Former municipalities in North Carolina